Benjamin Edward Powell (August 28, 1905 – March 11, 1981) was an American librarian and president of the American Library Association from 1959 to 1960.

Powell was born in Sunbury, North Carolina to Willis Warren and Beatrice Franklin Powell. He attended Trinity College, graduating in 1926. After graduation, he accepted a position at the Duke University library. He took a leave of absence from 1929 to 1930 to attend Columbia University to pursue a degree in library science. Powell continued his education at the graduate library school at the University of Chicago from 1934 to 1935 and in 1937 he took the position of head librarian at the University of Missouri. He received his doctorate in library science from the University of Chicago in 1946. 

Powell became university librarian at Duke University in 1946 and served in that role until he retired in 1975. At Duke, he oversaw an expansion of the University library and integrated the University Archives became a part of the library.

Publications
 "The University Libraries, Duke University" (1959)

References

 

1905 births
1981 deaths
American librarians
Presidents of the American Library Association
University of Chicago Graduate Library School alumni
Columbia University School of Library Service alumni
Duke University Trinity College of Arts and Sciences alumni